U.S. Customhouse or United States Custom House may refer to:
(ordered by U.S. state or U.S. territory, and then by city)

US Custom House (Nogales, Arizona), listed on the National Register of Historic Places (NRHP) in Santa Cruz County
United States Customhouse (San Francisco), California
United States Custom House (San Ysidro, California), listed as "U.S. Inspection Station/U.S. Custom House" on the NRHP in San Diego County
United States Customhouse (Denver), Colorado
United States Customhouse (Savannah, Georgia)
United States Customs House (Chicago), Illinois
United States Custom House (New Orleans), Louisiana
United States Customhouse (Kennebunkport, Maine)
United States Custom House (Portland, Maine)
United States Custom House (Baltimore), Maryland
United States Customshouse (Barnstable, Massachusetts)
United States Customhouse (New Bedford, Massachusetts)
U.S. Customs Building (Sweet Grass, Montana), NRHP-listed in Toole County
Alexander Hamilton U.S. Custom House, New York City, New York
United States Customhouse (Niagara Falls, New York)
Robert C. McEwen United States Custom House, Ogdensburg, New York
United States Customhouse (Oswego, New York)
United States Customhouse (Portland, Oregon)
United States Custom House (Philadelphia), listed on the NRHP in Philadelphia County
United States Customs House (Fajardo, Puerto Rico), listed on the NRHP
United States Custom House (Mayagüez, Puerto Rico)
United States Customs House (Ponce, Puerto Rico)
United States Custom House (San Juan, Puerto Rico), listed on the NRHP
United States Customshouse (Providence, Rhode Island)
United States Custom House (Charleston, South Carolina)
United States Customhouse (Houston), Texas
Owen B. Pickett United States Custom House, Norfolk, Virginia

See also 
 U.S. Customhouse and Post Office (disambiguation)